Delphine Minoui (born 1974) is a French journalist specializing in the Iranian world.

Life 
She majored in journalism at the CELSA Paris in 1997, then graduated from the EHESS in 1999.

Delphine Minoui moved to Iran to practice her profession. 
A correspondent of France Inter and France Info from 1999, she collaborated from 2002 with Le Figaro. She has also directed and collaborated on several documentaries.

In 2006, Delphine Minoui was awarded the prix Albert Londres for a series of articles on Iraq and Iran.

She recently wrote about Nojoud Ali, the first little girl to get divorced in Yemen.

Bibliography 
2010: 
2007: 
2009: 
2009: Ali, Nojoud; Minoui, Delphine. Moi, Nojoud, 10 ans, divorcée (in French). Paris: Michel Lafon. p. 286. 
2010: Ali, Nojoud; Minoui, Delphine. I Am Nujood, Age 10 and Divorced (in English, trans. LInda Coverdale). New York: Crown Publishing Group / Three Rivers Press. p. 188. .
2005: 
2015:  
2019: I'm Writing You from Tehran (in English, trans. Emma Ramadan). New York: Farrar, Straus and Giroux. p. 320. .
2017: Les passeurs de livres de Daraya: Une bibliothèque secrète en Syrie (in French). Paris: Seuil. p. 160. .
2020: The Book Collectors: A Band of Syrian Rebels and the Stories That Carried Them Through a War (in English, trans. Lara Vergnaud). New  York: Farrar, Straus and Giroux, 2020. p. 208. .

References

External links 
  Blog sur l'Iran by Delphine Minoui on the official site of le Figaro
 La lettre persane de Delphine Minoui on France Culture
 La lettre persane de Delphine Minoui on France 24
 Je vous écris de Téhéran on Éditions du Seuil
 Pourquoi les femmes sont l'avenir de l'Iran on Paris Match (31 October 2016)
 Je vous écris de Téhéran : l’Iran entre les lignes on Libération (23 March 2015)
 Delphine Minoui : La guignole de l'info on Iran Resist (25 December 2015) 

1974 births
Living people
21st-century French journalists
French women journalists
Albert Londres Prize recipients
French expatriates in Iran
French people of Iranian descent
21st-century French women
Le Figaro people